Sławomir Marcin Mocek (born 27 October 27, 1976) is a Polish fencer. He competed in the foil events at the 2000 and 2008 Summer Olympics.

References

1976 births
Living people
Polish male fencers
Olympic fencers of Poland
Fencers at the 2000 Summer Olympics
Fencers at the 2008 Summer Olympics
People from Leszno
Sportspeople from Greater Poland Voivodeship
Universiade medalists in fencing
Universiade bronze medalists for Poland
20th-century Polish people
21st-century Polish people